Air Liquide S.A. (literally "liquid air") is a French multinational company which supplies industrial gases and services to various industries including medical, chemical and electronic manufacturers. Founded in 1902, after Linde it is the second largest supplier of industrial gases by revenues and has operations in over 80 countries. It has headquarters at the 7th arrondissement of Paris. Air Liquide owned the patent for Aqua-Lung until it expired.

Air Liquide's headquarters are in Paris. It also has major sites in Japan, Houston, Newark, Delaware, Frankfurt, Shanghai and Dubai. The company's research and development (R&D) targets the creation of industrial gases, and also gases that are used in products such as healthcare items, electronic chips, foods, and chemicals. The major R&D groups within Air Liquide focus on analysis, bioresources (foods and chemicals), combustion, membranes, modeling, and the production of hydrogen (H2) gas.

History

1900 - 1930: Creation and introduction to the Paris Stock Exchange 

On May 25, 1902, and after two years of research, Georges Claude developed a process for liquefying air in order to separate the components (oxygen, nitrogen, argon). On November 8, 1902, Paul Delorme gathered twenty-four subscribers, mainly engineers, to financially support the project, and became the first president of "Air liquide, a company for the study and exploitation of Georges Claude processes". The company originally had a capital of 100,000 francs.

In 1906, Air Liquide began operations in Belgium and Italy, followed by Canada, Japan and Hong Kong. On February 20, 1913, the company was listed on the Paris Stock Exchange.

1930 - 1950: International development and innovations 

In 1938, Air Liquide acquired La oxígena S.A.and started its activities in Argentina. In 1943, under the aegis of engineer Émile Gagnan (an employee of Air Liquide) and Lieutenant-Commander (ship-of-the-Line Lieutenant) Jacques-Yves Cousteau, Air Liquide manufactured scuba set prototypes that Cousteau and Frédéric Dumas used to shoot the underwater film Épaves (Shipwrecks), directed by Cousteau the same year. They were the first modern diving regulators.

In 1945, after the Second World War, Jean Delorme, the son of Paul Delorme and the second President of the Group, wanted to renovate and develop industrial tools. In 1946, Air Liquide founded La Spirotechnique , a design and marketing company for regulators and other diving equipment. The same year, La Spirotechnique launched the CG45, the first modern diving regulator to be marketed. This marked the beginning of the popularization of scuba diving.

1950s: Large industries and Space research activities 
In 1957, Air Liquide began its activity in the large industry and created networks of pipelines irrigating several large industrial basins in the world.

In the 1960s, the company acquired American Cryogenics, as well as several other American companies.

In 1962, Air Liquide launched its activities into the space industry.

In 1970, the company inaugurates the Claude-Delorme Research & Development Center, located in Les Loges-en-Josas (Yvelines) where over 250 researchers work in 35 laboratories, covering various research areas such as applied mathematics, clinical trials and process engineering. In March 2014, the group announced its intentions to expand and modernize the center.

In 1986, Air Liquide expanded into the United States with the acquisition of Big Three for $1.05 billion, a US-based company with operations in many countries across Europe and Asia. That same year, it acquired SEPPIC, a French specialty chemicals company, as part of its activities in the healthcare sector.

1990 - 2010: Creation of Air Liquide Healthcare and acquisition strategy in the health sector 
In 1995, Air Liquide created Air Liquide Healthcare, a structure fully dedicated to the medical sector and specializing in the supply of medical gases, material and services for  hospitals, and patient homes,

In 1996, Air Liquide acquired the German company Schuelke and May.

Since the 2000 decade, Air Liquide increased significantly its investments in hydrogen production plants, with an increase by more than 50% between 2005 and 2008, making it one of the major segment of its offer.

In 2001, Suez-Lyonnaise des Eaux unsuccessfully attempted to acquire Air liquide.

In 2001, Air Liquide acquired Messer Griesheim's operations  in South Africa, Trinidad and Tobago, Canada, Egypt, Argentina and Brazil for €185 million. That same year, Air Liquide acquired the remaining  the 57% it did not yet hold from Hede Nielsen, a Danish company, which it had partially bought back in the 1990s.

In 2003, Air Liquide formed a joint venture with The BOC Group in Japan, thus creating Japan Air Gases (JAG) and strengthening the group's presence in the Far East.

In 2004, Air Liquide acquired two-thirds of Messer Griesheim's global activities, consisting of operations in Germany, the United Kingdom and the United States, for $2.7 billion. Shortly after, it resold some of the US activities.

In 2005, Air Liquide acquired the remaining 13.2% in the Far East Oxygen and Acetylene Company (SOAEO), for an approximately amount of €150 million.

In 2007, Air Liquide acquired the activities of Linde Gas in the United Kingdom, as well as the German engineering company, Lurgi, for €550 million, which doubled the engineering capacity of the group. During the same year, it acquired Scott Specialty Gases, LLC.  Air Liquide Global E&C Solutions GmbH (formerly Lurgi GmbH), a German engineering, construction, and chemical process licensing company which was part of Metallgesellschaft has been a part of Air Liquide S. A. since 2007. The head office is located in Frankfurt am Main.

In early 2008, Air Liquide entered a long-term contract with Neste Oil's Renewable Diesel Plant to supply hydrogen.

In 2012, Air Liquide created a joint venture with the Belgian group Solvay, to produce fluorinated gases for flat screens and photovoltaic panels.

In the same year, it acquired a production unit located in Louisiana, owned by the American company Georgia Gulf, 75% of the Russian Logika company, as well as LVL Medical, and the Spanish company Gasmedi, the third company in Spain in the home health sector, for €330 million.

Recent developments 
In 2013, Air Liquide created ALIAD, a venture capital investor, with the objective to invest in start-ups and future technologies specializing in the energy transition, health and digital sectors. The company was established the same year in the Air Liquide innovation laboratory in Paris, the i-Lab, launched in 2013 to support and share innovation across the Group.

As part of the development project for the Paris-Saclay Scientific and Technological Center, the company became a partner of two research and training institutes. Since then, it has been hosting the PS2E Institute (Paris-Saclay Energy Efficiency) at its Loges-en-Josas site, and has been supporting the Photovoltaic Institute of Ile-de-France (IPVF) by providing logistical resources.

On March 25, 2014, Air Liquide announced an equity investment, via ALIAD, the venture capital investor of the Group, in three companies specializing in sustainable and renewable energy: McPhy Energy, Solumix and Xylowatt. ALIAD also invested in startups specializing in the Internet of Things (Sigfox in 2015) and artificial intelligence (Proxem in 2016). In the four years following its creation, Aliad invests in more than 30 startups specializing in the energy transition, health and digital sectors.

In November 2015, Air Liquide announced it would acquire the American firm Airgas for a total of $13.4 billion, including debt.  The Airgas shareholders approved Air Liquide's acquisition on February 23, 2016. On May 23, 2016, Air Liquide announced the completion of the acquisition of Airgas.

In December 2016, Air Liquide sold its subsidiary Aqua Lung International to Montagu Private Equity.

In 2016,  Air Liquide's fund ALIAD notably took participation in Carmat, Inpria, Poly-Shape and Solidia Technologies. By June 2016, the total amount of investment made by ALIAD amounted to more than €60 million. ALIAD's investments focus on health, energy transition and high-tech start-up, and support them by setting up privileged R&D and business agreements.

In 2016, Air Liquide announced a new strategic plan called Neos, with an important focus on digital transformation. As part this project, the group opened two major remote operations centers : Saint-Priest, France, in 2017, and in Kuala Lumpur in 2018. The centers enable real-time analysis of the data and activities of connected factories and production units.

In May 2017, Air Liquide announced the sale of Welding, its subsidiary of 2,000 employees, specialized in the production of welding gas, to Lincoln Electric.

In August of the same year, Air Liquide took control of Skagerak Naturgass AG, a subsidiary of Skagerak Energi, producer of biomethane for vehicles in Norway Air Liquide had previously bought its Swedish counterpart Fordonsgas in 2014. Skagerak Energi belongs to Statkraft ("1st European producer of renewables" according to Air Liquide press release) Today, Air Liquide therefore has 54 biogas stations in northern Europe and it has installed one of the world's largest biogas liquefaction plants in Sweden (Lidkoping).

In 2017, Air Liquide signed an agreement with Cargill to build a biodiesel plant in Kansas, US. The operation is planned to start in January 2019 to produce 60 million gallons of biodiesel a year. Air Liquide and Cargill have already built six biodiesel plants together worldwide.

In January 2018, the group announced an investments of 150 million euros in Asia to finance the construction of ultra pure nitrogen production units, a "carrier gas" used in the composition of various electronic applications.

In February 2018, Air Liquide launched the world's largest oxygen production unit for Sasol, an international energy and chemicals company.

In September 2018, Air Liquide inaugurated its Paris Innovation Campus, located on the "Plateau de Saclay", near Paris. The campus includes Air Liquide's largest Research & Development Center, fully renovated with an investment of €50 million. On this occasion, Air Liquide announced the creation of a deep-tech start-up accelerator on the Innovation Campus by 2019.

At the end of 2018, Air Liquide announced its climate objectives and aims to reduce its carbon emissions by 30% by 2025. Among the measures stated: increase renewable electricity purchases by nearly 70%, improve the energy efficiency of production units and reduce the carbon footprint of products by 10%, by influencing both production and transport.

Activities

Large Industries 
Air Liquide generates about a third of its sales revenue by supplying the large industry (26% in 2017): chemicals, petrochemicals, metallurgy and refining. Air Liquide supply them with gas and energy by direct pipeline. Its pipeline network in the largest industrial basins is the longest in the world (more than 9000 km).  In 2018, the group's largest hydrogen production unit is located in the industrial zone of Yanbu, Saudi Arabia, and has a capacity of 340,000 Nm3/hour thanks to its two production sites.

In February 2018, Air Liquide launched the world's largest oxygen production unit for Sasol, an international energy and chemicals company.

In 2018, this activity was ensured by 52 hydrogen production units, 19 cogeneration units and 369 air separation units. This specialty represents 27% of the 2019 turnover of Air Liquide Gas and Services activities.

Industrial Merchant 
Small and Medium Enterprises use gas in small and medium quantities, in very diversified sectors (food, heat treatment of metals, manufacture of glass or welding-cutting of metal parts, etc.). These gases are delivered and stored in liquid form, packaged in bottles or produced directly on the customers' site. Air liquide also produces solid carbon dioxide (dry ice) under the name "Carboglace" (in France). Air Liquide GIS (Industrial Gas Services) and Air Liquide Santé hold a fleet of over twelve thousand tankers worldwide.

In 2019, this specialty represents 46% of Air Liquide's Gas & Services revenue.

Healthcare 
Air Liquide's activities in the health sector, through Air Liquide Healthcare, represented 18% of its gas and services sales revenue in 2016. The group provides medically prescribed home and hospital treatments for patients with chronic illnesses such as COPD (chronic obstructive pulmonary disease), sleep apnea or diabetes.

The main medical gases manufactured are:

 oxygen, to fight against hypoxia (insufficient amount of oxygen in the blood);
 nitrous oxide and xenon (Lenoxe), used as anesthetics;
 the (/) mixture for the treatment of pain (Kalinox);
 nitric oxide (NO) used to treat pulmonary arterial hypertension (Kinox).
 liquid nitrogen for cryotherapy;
 medical  for laparoscopy.

The Group also provides hygiene and disinfection solutions, through its German subsidiary  (Germany), as well as sterilization of surgical instruments, to fight against nosocomial diseases. Finally, through its subsidiary Air liquide Medical Systems, Air Liquide is also a manufacturer of medical equipment (ventilation, anesthesia, valve regulator).

For its activities in research and development in the health sector, Air Liquide formed partnerships with several international research centers such as MGH (Massachusetts General Hospital, Boston, USA), ICM (Institut du Cerveau et de la Moelle épinière, France), Pasteur Institute, (France) or Leuven University (Belgium). Air Liquide Healthcare employs over 250 researchers for its R&D activities.

Air liquide allocates part of its research activities to the development of e-health solutions, particularly in remote medical monitoring and remote support of patients through connected measurement devices, for patients with COPD, diabetes or sleep apnea.

In 2017, the Group said it provided more than 15,000 hospitals and clinics with gases and equipment, and 1,6 million patients around the world.

In 2019, this specialty accounted for 18% of Air Liquide's Gas & Services revenue.

In 2020, Air Liquide along with Schneider Electric, Groupe PSA, and Valeo were asked to produce ventilators for intensive care units (COVID-19) by the Health Department.  85% of the models produced are primarily intended for short-term use.

Spaceflight 
Air Liquide has a plant located just outside Kennedy Space Center that provides gaseous nitrogen via two systems, an air separation system for standard daily needs and a launch support system for periods of higher demand. During the Artemis 1 wet dress rehearsal the level of flow was insufficient, something that will be solved by a planned upgrade of separation equipment.

Electronics 
Air liquide supplies semiconductor manufacturers, flat panel displays and the photovoltaic industry with ultra-high purity gases, also called "carrier gases", chemical liquids and equipment for the application of these fluids. For its activity in the electronic sector, the group employs more than 3,000 people.

In 2019, this specialty represents 9% of Air Liquide's Gas & Services revenue.

Global Market and Technologies 
Initiated in 2015, the activity brings together all the activities related to the energy transition, particularly in terms of clean transport and biogas, the space industry and hydrogen energy. It includes all the activities  developing the use of gases in offshore energy production and the transport of high value-added molecules.

Air Liquide developed a helium cooling process for the ITER experimental reactor, an experimental fusion reactor located in Saint-Paul-Lez-Durance, France, built in the early 2010s.

In June 2016, Air Liquide set up its first multi-energy service station offering alternative fuels and, more generally, natural fuels: Compressed Natural Gas (CNG), Liquefied Natural Gas (LNG) and Liquid Nitrogen (N2). This alternative now allows road drivers to refill their refrigerated vehicles with refrigerant gas through a pump delivering liquid nitrogen. Hydrogen could later supplement this panel of energies.

The control of the hydrogen chain, from production to distribution and storage, is a priority focus of Air Liquide's research, which focuses on the applications of hydrogen energy in transportation, from the space domain to the automobile. The group is involved in the development of hydrogen stations around the world, and is at the initiative of the group of multinationals who participated in the launch of the "Hydrogen Council", created at the World Economic Forum in Davos 2017 to promote this new energy.

For space missions, Air Liquide creates cryogenic equipment for launchers, orbital systems, firing points and sensors cooled at very low temperatures. In Sassenage, France, it builds liquid oxygen tanks for Ariane 5, and in Les Mureaux, the propellant tanks of the launcher's first level.

Global Markets & Technologies generated €474 million revenue in 2018.

In early 2018, Air Liquide commissioned three new biomethane production units, in the United States, in France, and in the United Kingdom. Its new units doubled Air Liquide's biomethane capacity, reaching 60MW, the equivalent of 500 GWh for a full year of production.

Engineering and Construction 
The main activity of Air Liquide Engineering & Construction is the design, engineering and construction of processing facilities and associated infrastructure. It is the primary engineering partner for plants operated by the Air Liquide Group, but also a technology provider and engineering partner to third parties as well.

Air Liquide Engineering & Construction employs more than 3,000 workers across 15 engineering centers around the world, and owns over 1,600 technology and process patents. This portfolio includes both the historical Air Liquide cryogenics and related technologies, as well as the acquired Lurgi AG technologies, notably syngas, methanol, Rectisol, and other licensed technologies.

Corporate structure

Board of Directors
Composed as follows as of July 2021:

Benoît Potier, Chairman of the board (term ends 2026)
François Jackow, current CEO of Air Liquide (term ends 2026)
Annette Winkler, current CEO of Smart Automobile (term ends 2026)
Philippe Dubrulle, Air Liquide employee, representative of employees on the Board (term ends 2026)
Xavier Huillard, current CEO of Vinci (term ends 2025)
Bertrand Dumazy, current Chairman and CEO of Edenred (term ends 2025)
Aiman Ezzat, current Chairman and CEO of Capgemini (term ends 2025)
Annette Bronder, current COO of Swiss Re (term ends 2024)
Fatima Tighlaline, Air Liquide employee, representative of employees on the Board (term ends 2024)
Kim Anne Mink, former CEO and Chairwoman of Innophos (term ends 2024)
Siân Herbert-Jones, current CFO of Sodexo (term ends 2023)
Geneviève Berger, former Chief Research Officer and Chief Science Officer for Unilever, former physician (term ends 2023)

CEOs 
Run by the founding family until 1945, the company has known 6 presidents since its creation. Between 2001 and 2006, Alain Joly (Chairman of the supervisory board) and Benoît Potier (Chairman of the executive board) led the management team in pairs, before Benoît Potier took charge of the group. In 2022, François Jackow became CEO and joined the board of directors. Benoît Potier remains Chairman of the board of directors.

 1902 - 1945 : Paul Delorme
 1945 - 1985 : Jean Delorme
 1985 - 1995 : Édouard de Royère
 1995 - 2001 : Alain Joly
 2001 - 2006 : Alain Joly (Chairman of the supervisory board) and Benoît Potier (Chairman of the executive board)
 2006 - 2022 : Benoît Potier (remains Chairman of the board of directors)
 2022 (current) : François Jackow

Financial data

Source :OpesC

By 29 February 2016, the company had a share value of 33,434 million euros, distributed in 344,222,603 shares.

See also 

 Fusion Industry Association

References

External links

 

 
CAC 40
Companies listed on Euronext Paris
Chemical companies established in 1902
Chemical companies of France
French brands
Companies in the Euro Stoxx 50
Industrial gases
Manufacturing companies based in Paris
French companies established in 1902